The 1995–96 New Jersey Devils season was the 22nd season for the National Hockey League franchise that was established on June 11, 1974, and 14th season since the franchise relocated from Colorado prior to the 1982–83 NHL season. After winning the Stanley Cup in the previous season, and qualifying for the playoffs for six seasons, the team failed to make the playoffs for the first time since 1989, losing their last game of the season with a chance to qualify for the postseason. They became the first defending Stanley Cup champions to fail to make the playoffs since the 1969–70 Montreal Canadiens.

Regular season
The Devils were the least penalized team during the regular season, being shorthanded only 319 times. They also had the lowest shooting percentage in the NHL, scoring only 215 goals on 2,637 shots (8.2%).

Final standings

Schedule and results

Player statistics

Regular season
Scoring

Goaltending

Note: GP = Games played; G = Goals; A = Assists; Pts = Points; +/- = Plus/minus; PIM = Penalty minutes; PPG = Power-play goals; SHG = Short-handed goals; GWG = Game-winning goals
      MIN = Minutes played; W = Wins; L = Losses; T = Ties; GA = Goals against; GAA = Goals against average; SO = Shutouts; SA = Shots against; SV = Shots saved; SV% = Save percentage;

Awards and records

Awards

Transactions

Draft picks
Team's picks at the 1995 NHL Entry Draft, held in Edmonton, Alberta, Canada, at Edmonton Coliseum.

See also
1995–96 NHL season

Notes

References

New Jersey Devils seasons
New Jersey Devils
New Jersey Devils
New Jersey Devils
New Jersey Devils
20th century in East Rutherford, New Jersey
Meadowlands Sports Complex